Rose o' the Sea is a lost 1922 American silent drama film directed by Fred Niblo.

Cast
 Anita Stewart as Rose Elton
 Rudolph Cameron as Elliot Schuyler
 Thomas Holding as Peter Schuyler
 Margaret Landis as Vivienne Raymond
 Kate Lester as Lady Maggie
 Hallam Cooley as Roger Walton
 J. P. Lockney as Daddy Eton (as John P. Lockney)
 Charles Belcher as George Thornton

References

External links

1922 films
1922 drama films
American silent feature films
American black-and-white films
Films directed by Fred Niblo
Silent American drama films
Films produced by Louis B. Mayer
Lost American films
First National Pictures films
Films with screenplays by Bess Meredyth
1920s American films